Pellevoisin is a commune in the Indre department in central France.

Marian apparitions

On the night of 14 February 1876, as she lay in Pellevoisin dying of pulmonary tuberculosis, Estelle Faguette, a domestic servant, reportedly saw the Virgin Mary. Four days later, during the fifth apparition, Estelle seemed to be healed instantaneously. Subsequently, she had 10 other apparitions until 8 December 1876. She lived another fifty years, dying in 1929. She stated that Mary told her, 'If you want to serve me, be simple, and let your words and deeds agree'; that Mary asked that people should wear a scapular of the Sacred Heart, and that Mary indicated that she was distressed by people's neglect of her Son in prayer and the Blessed Sacrament.

The archbishops of Bourges have never pronounced on Estelle Faguette's reputed visions, although her cure has been formally recognised as a miracle; the Vatican has also given its approval for use of the Scapular of the Sacred Heart.

The Shrine of Our Lady of Pellevoisin is now entrusted to friars and sisters of the Community of St Jean; an annual pilgrimage takes place there on the last weekend in August.

Population

See also
Communes of the Indre department
Marian apparition

References

Communes of Indre